MPPL may refer to:

Multi Purpose Programming Language, an early name for PL/I
Marine Parade Public Library, a public library in Marine Parade, Singapore
Mount Prospect Public Library, a public library in Mount Prospect, Illinois